Qaleh Cham (also Romanized as Qal‘eh Cham, Qal‘eh-i-Cham, Qal‘eh-ye Cham, and Qal‘eh-ye Jam) is a village in Neyzar Rural District, Salafchegan District, Qom County, Qom Province, Iran. At the 2017 census, its population was 1500, in 350 families.

References 

Populated places in Qom Province